Zsolt Detre (born March 7, 1947) is a Hungarian sailor. He won the Olympic Bronze Medal in the 1980 Summer Olympics in the Flying Dutchman class along with his brother Szabolcs Detre.

Early life
His father was László Detre (an astronomer), and his niece is Diána Detre (a windsurfer).

References

1947 births
Olympic sailors of Hungary
Hungarian male sailors (sport)
Sailors at the 1980 Summer Olympics – Flying Dutchman
Olympic bronze medalists for Hungary
Olympic medalists in sailing
Living people
Medalists at the 1980 Summer Olympics